Anthony J. Mason (March 2, 1928 – July 23, 1994) was an American football coach. He was the head coach at the University of Cincinnati from 1973 to 1976 and at the University of Arizona in Tucson from 1977 through  compiling a career college football record of  

Prior to Cincinnati, Mason was an assistant coach for nine seasons in the Big Ten Conference, five at Michigan under Bump Elliott and four at Purdue. Earlier, he was the head coach at Niles McKinley High School in Niles, Ohio, where the Red Dragons won state championships in 1961 and 1963. Mason was elected to the Ohio High School Athletic Association Hall of Fame in 2002; he died in 1994 at age 66, after collapsing at Cleveland Hopkins International Airport.

Head coaching record

College

References

External links
 

1928 births
1994 deaths
Arizona Wildcats football coaches
Cincinnati Bearcats football coaches
Michigan Wolverines football coaches
Purdue Boilermakers football coaches
High school football coaches in Ohio